Chatom is a town in Washington County, Alabama, United States. It incorporated in 1949. Chatom is the county seat of Washington County, holding the distinction since 1907. The town's population was 1,288 At the 2010 census, up from 1,193 in 2000.

Geography

Demographics

2000 census
At the 2000 census there were 1,193 people, 449 households, and 308 families living in the town. The ethnic makeup of the town was 67.23% White, 32.10% Black or African American, 0.42% Native American, 0.08% from other races, and 0.17% from two or more races. 0.50% of the population were Hispanic or Latino of any race.
Of the 449 households 38.1% had children under the age of 18 living with them, 48.6% were married couples living together, 18.0% had a female householder with no husband present, and 31.4% were non-families. 28.7% of households were one person and 15.4% were one person aged 65 or older. The average household size was 2.48 and the average family size was 3.10.

The age distribution was 27.9% under the age of 18, 9.1% from 18 to 24, 23.9% from 25 to 44, 19.3% from 45 to 64, and 19.9% 65 or older. The median age was 35 years. For every 100 females, there were 83.8 males. For every 100 females age 18 and over, there were 73.4 males.

The median household income was $31,319 and the median family income  was $41,563. Males had a median income of $36,518 versus $19,750 for females. The per capita income for the town was $16,650. About 17.3% of families and 23.5% of the population were below the poverty line, including 34.4% of those under age 18 and 20.9% of those age 65 or over.

2010 census
At the 2010 census there were 1,288 people, 458 households, and 326 families living in the town. There were 521 housing units at an average density of 47.8 per square mile (18/km2). The ethnic makeup of the town was 68.2% White, 31.1% Black or African American, 0% Native American, 0.3% from other races, and 0.4% from two or more races. 0.6% of the population were Hispanic or Latino of any race.
Of the 458 households 33.8% had children under the age of 18 living with them, 46.9% were married couples living together, 20.7% had a female householder with no husband present, and 28.8% were non-families. 26.2% of households were one person and 11.8% were one person aged 65 or older. The average household size was 2.49 and the average family size was 3.02.

The age distribution was 26.3% under the age of 18, 7.6% from 18 to 24, 23.9% from 25 to 44, 24.4% from 45 to 64, and 17.8% 65 or older. The median age was 38.8 years. For every 100 females, there were 90.3 males. For every 100 females age 18 and over, there were 95.7 males.

The median household income was $23,250 and the median family income  was $27,375. Males had a median income of $47,500 versus $28,235 for females. The per capita income for the town was $13,431. About 28.3% of families and 35.3% of the population were below the poverty line, including 56.3% of those under age 18 and 6.1% of those age 65 or over.

2020 census

As of the 2020 United States Census, there were 1,104 people, 398 households, and 249 families residing in the town.

Climate
The climate in this area is characterized by hot, humid summers and generally mild to cool winters.  According to the Köppen Climate Classification system, Chatom has a humid subtropical climate, abbreviated "Cfa" on climate maps.

Notable natives
 Rusty Jackson, former NFL punter for the Los Angeles Rams and Buffalo Bills
 Shawna Thompson, member of country music duo Thompson Square

References

County seats in Alabama
Towns in Washington County, Alabama
Towns in Alabama